Mehr davon! Die Single-Box 1995–2000 (More of it!) is a single box by the German punk band Die Toten Hosen. It contains some of the more important singles from 1995–2000, released in different variations with different singles. The 2005 release Mehr davon! Die Single-Box partly crosses over with this release and also has different variations.

Variations

29-track #1
CD1: "Nichts bleibt für die Ewigkeit"
CD2: "Zehn kleine Jägermeister"
CD3: "Alles aus Liebe (live)"
CD4: "Weihnachtsmann vom Dach"
CD5: "Auld Lang Syne"
CD6: "Schön sein"
CD7: "Unsterblich"
CD8: "Warum werde ich nicht satt?"

28-track
CD1: "Nichts bleibt für die Ewigkeit"
CD2: "Zehn kleine Jägermeister"
CD3: "Alles aus Liebe (live)"
CD4: "Weihnachtsmann vom Dach"
CD5: "Pushed Again"
CD6: "Schön sein"
CD7: "Unsterblich"
CD8: "Warum werde ich nicht satt?"

29-track #2
CD1: "Nichts bleibt für die Ewigkeit"
CD2: "Bonnie & Clyde"
CD3: "Zehn kleine Jägermeister"
CD4: "Alles aus Liebe (live)"
CD5: "Pushed Again"
CD6: "Schön sein"
CD7: "Unsterblich"
CD8: "Warum werde ich nicht satt?"

Track listings

Nichts bleibt für die Ewigkeit (1995)
 "Nichts bleibt für die Ewigkeit" (Nothing stays for infinity) (single edit) (von Holst, Frege/Müller, von Holst, Frege) − 3:54
 "Alkohol" (Alcohol) (Rohde/Frege) − 2:03
 "Prominentenpsychose" (Celebrity psychosis) (Frege/Frege) – 3:14
 "Die '7' ist alles" (The '7' is everything) (Meurer/Frege) − 5:12

Bonnie & Clyde (1996)
 "Bonnie & Clyde" (Breitkopf/Frege) − 3:30
 "Kleiner Junge" (Little boy) (von Holst/Frege) − 3:58
 "Herzglück harte Welle" (roughly Heartluck strong wave) (Rohde/Frege) – 1:57
 "Do You Love Me" (Stanley, Ezrin, Fowley) − 3:11 (Kiss cover)

Zehn kleine Jägermeister (1996)
 "Zehn kleine Jägermeister" (roughly Ten little hunters/Jägermeisters) (Rohde/Müller, Frege) − 4:21
 "We Love You" (Jagger/Richards) − 3:10 (The Rolling Stones cover)
 "Der König aus dem Märchenland" (The king from the fairytale land) (Breitkopf/Frege) − 4:15

Alles aus Liebe (live) (1997)
 "Alles aus Liebe" (All out of love) (Frege/Frege) − 4:10
 "Lügen" (Lies) (von Holst/Frege) − 4:03
 "Seelentherapie" (Soul therapy) (Breitkopf/Frege) − 4:38

Weihnachtsmann vom Dach (1998)
 "Weihnachtsmann vom Dach" (Santa Claus from the roof) (von Holst/Frege) − 4:02
 "Come All Ye Faithful" – 2:34
 "Jingle Bells (Dub Version)" – 5:34
 "Baby, du sollst nicht weinen" (Baby, you shouldn't cry) − 3:34

Pushed Again (1998)
 "Pushed Again" (Breitkopf/Frege) − 3:49
 "Alles ist eins" (All is one) (von Holst/Frege) − 3:21
 "Fliegen" (Flying) (Frege/Frege) – 4:28
 "Revenge" (Meurer/Frege, Smith) − 3:59

Auld Lang Syne (1999)
 "Auld Lang Syne" − 2:32
 "Morgen wird alles anders..." (Tomorrow everything will be different) − 3:45
 "Standort Deutschland" (roughly Germany as an economical target) − 3:26
 "The Little Drummer Boy (unplugged)" – 2:42
 "Auld Lang Syne (unplugged)" – 3:17

Schön sein (1999)
 "Schön sein" (To be beautiful) (Frege, van Dannen/Frege, van Dannen) − 3:12
 "You're Dead" (von Holst/Frege, Smith) – 4:41
 "Fußball" (Football) (von Holst/Frege) – 2:09
 "Im Westen nichts Neues" (All quiet on the Western front) (Breitkopf/Frege) – 1:59

Unsterblich (2000)
 "Unsterblich" (Immortal) (Frege, von Holst/Frege) − 3:46
 "Wofür man lebt (Dub-Version)" (What for one lives) (von Holst, Meurer/Frege) − 3:22
 "Psycho" (Roslie/Roslie) − 1:44 (The Sonics cover)

Warum werde ich nicht satt? (2000)
 "Warum werde ich nicht satt?" (roughly Why don't I get enough?) (Breitkopf, von Holst/Frege) − 3:28
 "Babylon's Burning" (Jennings, Ruffy, Owen, Fox) − 4:25 (The Ruts cover)
 "Should I Stay or Should I Go?" (Mick Jones/Joe Strummer) − 2:43 (The Clash cover)

Personnel
Campino - vocals
Andreas von Holst - guitar
Michael Breitkopf - guitar
Andreas Meurer - bass
Wolfgang Rohde - drums
Vom Ritchie - drums

2001 compilation albums
Die Toten Hosen compilation albums